"King Without a Crown" is a song by English band ABC, released as the third and final single from their fourth studio album, Alphabet City (1987). It peaked at No. 44 on the UK Singles Chart.

Critical reception
Upon its release as a single, Robin Smith of Record Mirror described "King Without a Crown" as another "goodie from the ABC chocolate box for those more tender moments" and also noted the "luscious production".

Track listing
 UK CD single
"King Without a Crown" – 4:40
"The Look of Love" (Live in Boston) – 6:02
"Poison Arrow" (Live in Boston) – 4:37
"King Without a Crown" (Monarchy Mix, Abridged Version) – 4:12

Chart performance

References

ABC (band) songs
1988 singles
Songs written by Martin Fry
Songs written by Mark White (musician)
1987 songs
Mercury Records singles